The Mareeg Newspaper is an independent newspaper based in Mogadishu, the capital city of Somalia. Founded in 2019, it provides domestic news both in Somali and English. The outlet is part of the larger Mareeg Media that is headquartered in the city. Mareeg Newspaper is published 6 days in the week.

References

Publications established in 2019
Newspapers published in Somalia
2010s establishments in Somalia
Mass media in Mogadishu